Haynesville Junior/Senior High School is a public junior and senior high school in Haynesville, Louisiana, United States, and a part of the Claiborne Parish School Board.

Athletics
Haynesville Senior High athletics competes in the LHSAA.

Baseball
Basketball
Cross Country
Football
Powerlifting
Softball
Track and Field
Cheer
Dance line

Championships
Football championships
(17) State Championships: 1924, 1929, 1936, 1970, 1971, 1984, 1987, 1990, 1991, 1993, 1994, 1995, 1996, 2000, 2009, 2013, 2014

Coaches
 Red Franklin - LHSAA Hall of Fame Head Coach, Alton "Red" Franklin, won eleven state championships (1970, 1971, 1984, 1987, 1990, 1991, 1993, 1994, 1995, 1996, 2000) and were state runners-up four times in thirty-five seasons. He finished with a record of 366–76–8 and a .822 winning percentage with eight perfect seasons at Haynesville. Franklin was also an assistant coach at Marksville High School and head coach at Springhill High School. During his playing career, Franklin played football for the University of Alabama and at Louisiana College.

References

External links
 Haynesville Junior/Senior High School
 

Schools in Claiborne Parish, Louisiana
Public high schools in Louisiana
Public middle schools in Louisiana